Berlin-Pankow is an electoral constituency (German: Wahlkreis) represented in the Bundestag. It elects one member via first-past-the-post voting. Under the current constituency numbering system, it is designated as constituency 76. It is located in northern Berlin, comprising the Pankow borough.

Berlin-Pankow was created for the 2002 federal election. Since 2021, it has been represented by Stefan Gelbhaar of the Alliance 90/The Greens.

Geography 
Berlin-Pankow is located in northern Berlin. As of the 2021 federal election, it comprises the Pankow borough excluding the area of Prenzlauer Berg east of Prenzlauer Allee.

History 
Berlin-Pankow was created in 2002 and contained parts of the abolished constituencies of Berlin Hohenschönhausen – Pankow – Weissensee and Berlin Mitte – Prenzlauer Berg. In the 2002 through 2009 elections, it was constituency 77 in the numbering system. Since the 2013 election, it has been number 76. Its borders have not changed since its creation.

Members 
The constituency was first represented by Wolfgang Thierse of the Social Democratic Party (SPD) from 2002 to 2009. Stefan Liebich of The Left won the constituency in 2009, and was re-elected in 2013 and 2017. Stefan Gelbhaar won the constituency for the Greens in 2021.

Election results

2021 election

2017 election

2013 election

2009 election

References 

Federal electoral districts in Berlin
Pankow
2002 establishments in Germany
Constituencies established in 2002